

The Joint Declaration of the Denuclearization of the Korean Peninsula was an agreed action item between South Korea and North Korea signed on January 20, 1992. The declaration was issued February 19.

The declaration read in part as follows:

At the same time, the Agreement on Reconciliation, Non-aggression and Exchanges and Cooperation between the South and the North (also known as the "South-North Basic Agreement") was made, covering the areas of:
 South-North Reconciliation 
 South-North Non-Aggression
 South-North Exchanges And Cooperation

The joint Nuclear Control Commission specified by the agreement was created, and held 13 meetings in 1992 and 1993, but it did not come to any agreements. The last meeting was held in April 1993. So consequent to clause 6, the declaration never entered into force.

See also
Agreed Framework
North Korea and weapons of mass destruction

References 

Nuclear program of North Korea
North Korea–South Korea relations
History of Korea
History of North Korea
History of South Korea
1992 in North Korea
1992 in South Korea